The National Society for Women's Suffrage was the first national group in the United Kingdom to campaign for women's right to vote. Formed on 6 November 1867, by Lydia Becker, the organisation helped lay the foundations of the women's suffrage movement.

Eliza Wigham, Jane Wigham, Priscilla Bright McLaren and some of their friends set up an Edinburgh chapter of this National Society. Eliza and her friend Agnes McLaren became the secretaries.

Jacob Bright suggested in 1871 that it would be useful to create a London-based organisation to lobby members of parliament concerning women's suffrage. The Central Committee of the National Society for Women's Suffrage first met on 17 January 1872.

The national society was furthered later by the National Union of Women's Suffrage Societies and the Women's Social and Political Union.

References

See also
Women's suffrage in the United Kingdom
History of feminism
List of suffragists and suffragettes
List of women's rights organizations
List of women's rights activists
Timeline of women's suffrage
Women's suffrage organizations

Liberal feminist organizations
Women's suffrage in the United Kingdom
Feminist organisations in the United Kingdom
Feminism and history
Women's organisations based in the United Kingdom
1867 establishments in the United Kingdom
Suffrage organisations in the United Kingdom
Organizations established in 1867
First-wave feminism
British suffragists